Rajid Baransi (born 7 January 1979) is an Arab–Israeli footballer. A product of the youth system of Maccabi Ahi Nazareth, he was sought after by Hapoel and Maccabi Haifa but his motherclub preferred to sell him to Maccabi. Having trouble finding the net, during a match against Bnei Yehuda, Alon Mizrahi let him take a penalty kick so he could finally score his first goal in a professional match. With the arrival of Dušan Uhrin to the club, Baransi was released as Uhrin signed Maccabi Netanya's Liron Vilner and he promoted Yaniv Katan from the youth team.

References

External links
Rajid Baransi One.co.il 

1979 births
Living people
Arab citizens of Israel
Arab-Israeli footballers
Israeli footballers
Maccabi Haifa F.C. players
Maccabi Petah Tikva F.C. players
Hapoel Be'er Sheva F.C. players
Hapoel Beit She'an F.C. players
Maccabi Kafr Kanna F.C. players
Maccabi Ironi Tirat HaCarmel F.C. players
Ahva Arraba F.C. players
Hapoel Kafr Kanna F.C. players
Ihud Bnei Kafr Qara F.C. players
Liga Leumit players
Israeli Premier League players
Footballers from Nazareth
Association football forwards